USS Lady Mary (SP-212) was a United States Navy patrol vessel in commission from 1917 to 1918.

Lady Mary was built as the civilian yacht Glenda in 1905 by George Lawley & Son at Boston, Massachusetts. She was owned by B. E. Niese of New York City and C. S. Smith of Stamford, Connecticut, and was eventually renamed Lady Mary.

The U.S. Navy chartered Lady Mary on 16 July 1917 for World War I service as a patrol vessel and took delivery of her on 21 July 1917. She was commissioned at Newport, Rhode Island, as USS Lady Mary (SP-212) on 24 July 1917.

Assigned to the 2nd Naval District, headquartered at Newport, Lady Mary served on dispatch boat duty and patrolled coastal waters in Block Island Sound from Newport to Block Island.

Lady Mary was returned to her former owner on 9 December 1918.

References

NavSource Online: Section Patrol Craft Photo Archive: Lady Mary (SP 212)

Patrol vessels of the United States Navy
World War I patrol vessels of the United States
Ships built in Boston
1905 ships